Western Football Conference may refer to:

 Canadian Football League West Division, one of the two regional divisions of the Canadian Football League
 Western Football Conference (United States), a now-defunct NCAA Division II college football conference